Malta competed at the 1984 Summer Olympics in Los Angeles, United States.

Results by event

Archery
Women's individual
 Joanna Agius — 2240 points (41st place)

Athletics
Women's Javelin Throw 
 Jennifer Pace 
 Qualification — 47.92m (→ did not advance, 23rd place)

Nations at the 1984 Summer Olympics
1984
Summer Olympics